The Head of State of Estonia or State Elder was the official title of the Estonian head of state from 1920 to 1937. He combined some of the functions held by a president and prime minister in most other democracies.

According to the 1920 Estonian Constitution, which was enforced by the “Constitution of the Republic of Estonia, the Referendum Act and the Citizens’s Initiative Act Implementation Act“ on  July 2, 1920, after being approved by the Constituent Assembly on June 16, 1920 (Riigi Teataja August 9, 1920 No. 113/114), the Government of the Republic consisted of the riigivanem (Head of State) and Ministers (Section 58).

The responsibilities of the Head of State were representing the Republic of Estonia, administration and co-ordination of the activities of the Government of the Republic, chairing the Government meetings; the Head of State had the right to make inquiries about the activities of the Ministers (Section 62). The Government of the Republic appointed one of its members the Deputy of the Elder of State.

In practice, the Head of State had very little power.  The 1920 constitution was radically parliamentarian in character, and the Head of State could be voted out of office at any time.  This limited his ability to play a balancing role between the government and the legislature.

With the 1934 constitution, the institution saw a reform and it became the equivalent of a president only as a separate head of government was to be elected. The 1934 coup by Konstantin Päts resulted in the institution never coming to real life as he ruled as the Prime Minister in Duties of the Head of State until 1937.

Heads of State of the Republic of Estonia, 1920–1934

Head of State of the Republic of Estonia, 1934–1937

See also 
President of Estonia
Prime Minister of Estonia
Riigihoidja

Notes

References

 
Political history of Estonia
State Elder
Titles of national or ethnic leadership